National Route 24 is a national highway in South Korea connects Sinan County to Nam District, Ulsan. It established on 31 August 1971.

Main stopovers
South Jeolla Province
 Sinan County - Muan County - Hampyeong County - Jangseong County - Damyang County
North Jeolla Province
 Sunchang County - Namwon
South Gyeongsang Province
 Hamyang County - Geochang County - Hapcheon County - Changnyeong County - Miryang
Ulsan
 Ulju County - Nam District

Major intersections

 (■): Motorway
IS: Intersection, IC: Interchange

South Jeolla Province

North Jeolla Province

South Gyeongsang Province

Ulsan

References

24
Roads in South Jeolla
Roads in North Jeolla
Roads in South Gyeongsang
Roads in Ulsan